Radosav is a Montenegrin masculine given name. It may refer to:

Radosav Bulić (born 1977), Montenegrin retired footballer
Radosav Spasojević (born 1992), Montenegrin basketballer
Radosav Petrović (born 1989), Serbian footballer
Radosav Stojanović (born 1950), Serbian writer

See also
Radoslav
Radosavljević, patronymic surname

Serbian masculine given names